The Sanford School of Public Policy at Duke University is named after former Duke president and Governor of North Carolina Terry Sanford, who established the university's Institute for Policy Sciences and Public Affairs in 1971 as an interdisciplinary program geared toward training future leaders. When the School's current building on Duke's West Campus opened in 1994, the structure was named—and the Institute renamed—in honor of Sanford. The building was designed by Architectural Resources Cambridge, Inc. in a Modern Gothic style. The Sanford School offers bachelor's, master's, and doctoral programs in Public Policy.

A second building, named for principal benefactor David Rubenstein, opened in August 2005. The building houses several of the school's centers including the Duke Center for Child and Family Policy and the Duke Center for International Development. Rubenstein Hall had its formal dedication, which included a speech by former U.S. Secretary of State Colin Powell on November 4, 2005.

The Institute officially became Duke's tenth school on July 1, 2009, when it was renamed the Sanford School of Public Policy. The current dean of the Sanford School is Judith Kelley.

Academic programs

Undergraduate
Sanford offers an undergraduate major in Public Policy Studies. The undergraduate program was slightly altered starting with the class of 2009. The department also recently instituted several "pathways," or groups of classes focused on one aspect of public policy. One aspect of the program that is unique among Duke's undergraduate majors is the requirement of a public policy-related summer internship.

The Institute also offers two undergraduate certificates: the Child Policy Research Certificate and the Policy Journalism and Media Studies Certificate.

Sanford also runs a study-abroad program at the University of Glasgow in Scotland. One notable aspect of the fall semester program is a four-day tour of London and its important cultural and political institutions and meetings with members of Parliament.

Graduate
At the graduate level, the School currently offers Master of Public Policy and Master of International Development Policy degrees. It also offers an international Master of Environmental Policy (iMEP) degree with the Nicholas School of the Environment and Duke Kunshan University.

The program offers graduate level concentrations in six areas: Environment and Energy Policy, Health Policy, International Development Policy, National Security and Foreign Policy, Social Policy, and Technology Policy.

The Ph.D program started in the fall of 2007.

Centers and programs
The following centers and programs are affiliated with the Institute and/or operated by the Institute's faculty and staff.
The Duke University Center for Child and Family Policy
The Center for Strategic Philanthropy and Civil Society
The Duke Center for International Development
The DeWitt Wallace Center for Media and Democracy
The Hart Leadership Program
The Samuel and Ronnie Heyman Center for Ethics
Triangle Center on Terrorism and Homeland Security
Triangle Institute for Security Studies
Duke University Program on History, Public Policy and Social Change
The Population, Policy and Aging Research Center (PPARC)
The Program on Global Health and Technology Access
The Center for the Study of Philanthropy and Voluntarism
The United States – Southern Africa Center for Leadership and Public Values
The Program on Civil Society (Fleishman Civil Society Fellows)

Rankings
Top ten specialities and overall graduate level public affairs program as ranked by U.S. News & World Report in 2019:

3rd in Environmental Policy & Management
5th in Public-Policy Analysis
6th in Health Policy & Management
7th in Social Policy
27th in Public Finance & Budgeting
25th in overall graduate level public affairs program

References

External links
Sanford Institute Homepage
Duke University

Duke University
Public policy schools
Public administration schools in the United States
Educational institutions established in 1971
1971 establishments in North Carolina
Schools of international relations in the United States
Duke University campus